"Help Yourself" is a song recorded by Welsh singer Tom Jones in 1968. The song is one of Jones' best known songs and reached number five in the UK Singles Chart in its original run. It topped the charts in both Ireland and Germany, and spent three weeks at the top spot in Australia. The American single reached Billboard peaks of number 35 pop and number three easy listening, and is still widely played on adult-standards radio.

Chart performance

Weekly charts

Year-end charts

Original song 

"Help Yourself" is a reworked English-language version of the Italian song "Gli Occhi Miei" ("My Eyes"), which was written by Carlo Donida with lyrics by Mogol and originally performed by both Dino (Eugenio Zambelli) and Wilma Goich at the 1968 Sanremo Music Festival. British author and songwriter Jack Fishman (a.k.a. Larry Khan) wrote the English lyrics, which bear no relation to the original Italian.

Tony Ferrino version
The song was recorded by comedian Steve Coogan in character as Tony Ferrino. The track was used in the TV show, included on an album and released as a single in November 1996, reaching #42 in the UK singles chart.

Other cover versions

In 1968, Nora Aunor (a Filipino Superstar) released an English-language version on the album More, More, More of Nora Aunor which became a big hit on that same year in the Philippines
In 1968, Peter Alexander (Austrian performer) released a German language version called "Komm' und bedien' Dich bei mir" and reached no. 9 of the German charts.
Les Compagnons de la chanson released a French version titled "Ce bonheur-là", which reached No. 48 on the Belgian chart in 1968.
In 1968, Sten & Stanley released a Swedish language version called "Du och jag".
In 1970, Hong Kong female singer Billie Tam (蓓蕾), released a Mandarin Chinese-language version with Chinese lyrics written by Di Yi (狄薏) and given the title name of 夢遊人, on her 喇叭與我 (Billie And The Big Brass) LP album with EMI Angel Records.
In 1972, Hong Kong female singer Frances Yip (葉麗儀) recorded it on her Frances Yip Greatest Hits LP album with Life Records.
In 1973, Hong Kong female singer/artist Sum Sum (森森), also recorded the song in Mandarin Chinese language with Chinese lyrics (different from Billie Tam's version) written by Shu Yun (舒雲) and given the title name of 我比花兒好年華, on her 春雨傘‧森森玉女團南遊專輯 LP album with EMI Regal Records.
Between 1972 and 1974, this song was covered by Singapore-based female singer Ervinna, backing music by the Charlie & His Boys, on her LP album Golden Hits Of 20th Century Vol. 4 with White Cloud Record of Singapore.
In the 1970s this song was frequently performed by Soviet baritone singer Muslim Magomayev.
In 1978, the song was covered by Filipino singer Sam Sorono (1950–2008) on his Sings Tom Jones' Greatest Hits LP album with EMI Records.
The song is performed, by Tom Jones and Will Ferrell, in the 2004 movie Anchorman.
In 2015 the song was covered by Patrizio Buanne, Gli occhi miei-Help yourself, in Italian and English, on his album Viva la Dolce Vita.

References

External links
 Help Yourself - at lyrics.com

1968 singles
Tom Jones (singer) songs
Number-one singles in Australia
Number-one singles in Germany
Number-one singles in South Africa
UK Singles Chart number-one singles
Irish Singles Chart number-one singles
Songs written by Mogol (lyricist)
1968 songs
Decca Records singles
Parrot Records singles
Songs written by Carlo Donida
Sanremo Music Festival songs
Song recordings produced by Peter Sullivan (record producer)